The South Branch Marsh River is a  tidal river in the towns of Prospect and Frankfort in Waldo County, Maine. It joins the North Branch Marsh River to form Marsh Bay, a short arm of the tidal Penobscot River.

The South Branch forms in the town of Prospect at the confluence of Colson Stream and Carley Brook and flows north to its confluence with the North Branch.

See also
List of rivers of Maine

References

Maine Streamflow Data from the USGS
Maine Watershed Data From Environmental Protection Agency

Tributaries of the Penobscot River
Rivers of Maine